Madison is an unincorporated community and census-designated place (CDP) in Dorchester County, Maryland, United States. The population was 204 at the 2010 census.

History
In the early 19th century, the community was a hamlet known as "Tobacco Stick." Around 1822, Harriet Tubman was born just outside the hamlet; in her youth, she lived in her father's cabin nearby, in what is now the Blackwater National Wildlife Refuge.

Geography
Madison is located in western Dorchester County, at the south end of Madison Bay, an arm of the Little Choptank River and part of the Chesapeake Bay estuary system. Maryland Route 16 passes through the community, leading northeast  to Cambridge, the county seat, and southwest  to Taylors Island.

Demographics

References

Census-designated places in Dorchester County, Maryland
Census-designated places in Maryland
Maryland populated places on the Chesapeake Bay